The Waiuku River is southwest of the city of Auckland in New Zealand. Despite its name, the "river" is in fact an estuarial arm of the Manukau Harbour.

Rivers of the Auckland Region
Rivers of New Zealand
Estuaries of New Zealand
Manukau Harbour catchment